Trichoplon extremum is a species of beetle in the family Cerambycidae, the only species in the genus Trichoplon.

References

Ibidionini
Monotypic beetle genera